The Lion's Den is a surviving 1919 silent film drama directed by George D. Baker and starring Bert Lytell, Alice Lake and Edward Connelly. It was distributed by Metro Pictures.

Plot

Cast

Preservation status
 Copies exist at the UCLA Film and Television Archive and the British Film Institute.

References

External links

1919 films
Silent American drama films
American silent feature films
1919 drama films
American black-and-white films
Films directed by George D. Baker
1910s American films